Scarlet Dream is a collection of science fiction short stories by C. L. Moore with illustrations by Alicia Austin. It was first published in 1981 by Donald M. Grant, Publisher, Inc. in an edition of 1,820 copies, of which 220 were bound in buckram, boxed, and signed by the author and artist. The stories feature Moore's character Northwest Smith. All but the last story originally appeared in the magazine Weird Tales.

Contents
 "Shambleau"
 "Black Thirst"
 "The Tree of Life"
 "Scarlet Dream"
 "Dust of Gods"
 "Lost Paradise"
 "Julhi"
 "The Cold Gray God"
 "Yvala"
 "Song in a Minor Key"

References
 
 
 

1981 short story collections
Science fiction short story collections
Books illustrated by Alicia Austin
Donald M. Grant, Publisher books